The Dongfeng E-Star is an electric urban distribution truck manufactured by Dongfeng Motor Corporation.

Overview
The E-Star can carry up to 4.25 tonnes, but has been scaled down to 3.5 tonnes so it can also be driven with a category B licence. It has a separate chassis on which different body types can be fitted.

References

External links
 Official website

Production electric cars
Cars of China
Dongfeng vehicles